Mutasa North is a constituency of the National Assembly of the Parliament of Zimbabwe, located in Manicaland Province. Its current MP since the 2018 election is Chido Madiwa of ZANU–PF.

Profile
The constituency has 29,627 registered voters according to the 2008 ZEC Delimitation Report. Mutasa North is home to Honde Valley, Zindi, Hauna Business Centre and Green Valley. It is known for its rich soils and apple production. Majority of the residence find employment in the vast plantations. Mutasa North has a mixed and fair infrastructure development.

Election results
In the 2005 general election the candidate of the ZANU–PF was declared the winner, with an overall majority. This was in contrast to the fact that the candidate of the MDC polled an overall majority. 

In 2008 David Anthony Chimhini of MDC-T won against Major General Michael Nyambuya.

References 

Manicaland Province
Parliamentary constituencies in Zimbabwe